Circaea erubescens is a species of flowering plant in the evening primrose family Onagraceae.

References

erubescens